John Evans QC (died 1864) was a British Liberal politician. He represented Haverfordwest in Pembrokeshire, Wales, from the 1847 general election until his defeat in the 1852 general election.

At an 1855 by-election, he unsuccessfully sought election for Cardigan Boroughs.

After his death in 1864 his widow Mary and their children moved back from London to Haverfordwest and later to Jersey. In 1881 his children, including the poet George Essex Evans, emigrated to Australia.

References

Year of birth missing
1864 deaths
19th-century Welsh politicians
Members of the Parliament of the United Kingdom for Pembrokeshire constituencies
19th-century King's Counsel
UK MPs 1847–1852